Celeste Dupuy-Spencer (born 1979) is an American painter.

Biography
Dupuy-Spencer was born in New York City in 1979. She received a BFA degree from Bard College in 2007. She currently resides in Los Angeles, California.

Career
Dupuy-Spencer began exhibiting in 2007, including collaborations with Ridykeulous Project. In 2015, her work was included in the show Queer Fantasy at Morán Morán in Los Angeles. She had solo shows at the Nino Mier Gallery in 2016 and 2018, and at the Marlborough Gallery in 2017. Her work was included in the Hammer Museum's 2018 exhibition Made in L.A. and in the 2017 Whitney Biennial. 

In 2018, Dupuy-Spencer had a residency at the Elaine de Kooning House in East Hampton, New York. Dupuy-Spencer's work was included in the 2022 exhibition Women Painting Women at the Modern Art Museum of Fort Worth.

Dupuy-Spencer's work is held in the permanent collection of the Whitney Museum of American Art.

Personal
Dupuy-Spencer identifies as transgender, which is reflected in her subject matter.

References

External links
Images of Dupuy-Spencer at work at the Elaine de Kooning House
Images of Dupuy-Spencer's paintings

21st-century American artists
21st-century American women artists
1979 births
Living people